Dony Tri Pamungkas (born 11 January 2005) is an Indonesian professional footballer who plays as a midfielder for Liga 1 club Persija Jakarta and the Indonesia national under-20 team. He is the younger brother of Joko Sasongko.

Club career

Persija Jakarta
He was signed for Persija Jakarta to play in Liga 1 in the 2021 season. Dony made his first-team debut on 28 September 2021 as a substitute in a match against Persita Tangerang at the Pakansari Stadium, Cibinong.

International career

While playing for Persija U-19 against Indonesia U-20 national team in a 2-1 win on an exhibition match. Coach Shin Tae-yong was impressed with Dony's gameplay and decided to called him to the national team squad. On 14 September 2022, Dony made his debut for the under-20 team against Timor-Leste U-20, in a 4–0 win in the 2023 AFC U-20 Asian  Cup qualification.

On 28 October 2022, Dony scored a goal against Turkey U-20, on a 1-2 lost in a friendly match.

Career statistics

Club

Notes

International goals
International under-19 goals

References

External links
 Dony Tri Pamungkas at Soccerway
 Dony Tri Pamungkas at Liga Indonesia

2005 births
Living people
Indonesian footballers
Liga 1 (Indonesia) players
Persija Jakarta players
Association football midfielders
People from Boyolali Regency
Sportspeople from Central Java
Indonesia youth international footballers